The following is a timeline of the history of the city of Baltimore, Maryland, USA.

18th century
 1729 - Town of Baltimore founded.
 1752 - 25 houses and 200 inhabitants.
 1763 - Mechanical Fire Company organized.
 1767 - Baltimore designated county seat.
 1770 - Henry Fite House built.
 1773 - Maryland Journal, and the Baltimore Advertiser newspaper begins publication.
 1776 - December - Second Continental Congress meeting begins.
 1782 - Lexington Market founded.
 1784 - Christmas Conference (Methodism)
 1787 - 1,955 dwellings in town.
 1790 - Population: 13,503 people.
 1794 - James Calhoun becomes mayor.
 1795 - Holliday Street Theater opens.
 1796
 City of Baltimore incorporated.
 Library Company of Baltimore founded.

19th century

 1800 - Population: 26,504 people.
 1803
 Fort McHenry built.
 Dispensary incorporated.
 1806 - St. Mary's College and Theological Seminary incorporated.
 1807
 University of Maryland founded.
 Baltimore Museum established.
 Baltimore Circulating Library in business.
 1809 - Joseph Robinson's Circulating Library in business.
 1810
 Population: 46,535 people.
 Alex. Brown & Sons incorporated.
 1814
 September - Battle of Baltimore
 Peale Museum opens.
 1815
 Battle Monument erected.
 Baltimore Exchange opens.
 1816
 Asbury College founded.
 Delphian Club founded.
 1819 - Independent Order of Odd Fellows founded.
 1821
 Maryland Academy of Science and Literature established.
 Basilica consecrated.
 1822 - Adelphi Theatre opens.
 1823 - Athenaeum founded.
 1826 - Maryland Institute for the Promotion of the Mechanic Arts founded.
 1827
 Washington Medical College established.
 Franklin Lyceum active.
 1829
 Mount Clare Station built.
 George Washington monument erected.
 Circus building constructed.
 1830 - Baltimore and Ohio Railroad begins operating.
 1832
 Cholera epidemic.
 1832 Democratic National Convention
 1835
 1835 Democratic National Convention
 Bank riot.
 1837
 Baltimore Sun newspaper begins publication.
 Washington Hall opens.
 Orchard Street United Methodist Church built.
 1839
 High School opens.
 Mercantile Library Association established.
 Green Mount Cemetery dedicated.
 Municipal Record Office of Baltimore built.
 1840
 Madison Lyceum active.
 1840 Democratic National Convention
 1844
 Maryland Historical Society incorporated.
 Western High School (Baltimore) opens.
 1844 Democratic National Convention
 1844 Whig National Convention
 Baltimore-Washington telegraph line opens.
 1845 - Newton University established.
 1848
 Howard Athenaeum and Gallery of Arts opens.
 Olympic Theatre opens.
 Concordia Club founded.
 1848 Democratic National Convention
 1849 - Baltimore Female College in operation.
 1850 - President Street Station built.
 1851
 Baltimore becomes independent city.
 New Assembly-Rooms open.
 Baltimore Wecker newspaper begins publication.
 1852
 Loyola College established.
 Apollo Hall opens.
 1852 Democratic National Convention
 1852 Whig National Convention
 1853 - Baltimore Police Department established.
 1856
 Know-Nothing Riot.
 1856 Whig National Convention
 1857 - Peabody Institute founded.
 1859 - City Fire Department formed.
 1860 - 1860 Constitutional Union Convention
 1861 - Pratt Street Riot.
 1864
 St. Francis Xavier Church dedicated.
 1864 Republican National Convention
 1865 - Concordia Opera House opens.
 1867
 Concordia Hall is founded.
 Morgan College established.
 Normal school opens.
 1871 - Ford's Grand Opera-House opens.
 1872
 Mount Auburn Cemetery established.
 1872 Democratic National Convention
 1873 - Leadenhall Street Baptist Church built.
 1875
 City Hall built.
 Academy of Music opens.
 Free Summer Excursion Society incorporated.
 1876
 Johns Hopkins University founded.
 The Maryland Zoo opens.
 1877 - Railroad Strike.
 1878 - George Peabody Library opens.
 1880
 Woman's Industrial Exchange founded.
 Celebration of 150th anniversary of city.
 1881 - Faultless Pajama Company in business.
 1882 - Enoch Pratt Free Library established.
 1883
 Baltimore Manual Training School founded.
 Colored High and Training School founded.
 Baltimore Young Women's Christian Association founded.
 1885 - Goucher College established.
 1890
 Post office built.
 Population: 434,439 people.
 Riverview Park opens.
 1891 - Union Park baseball field opens.
 1892 - Baltimore Afro-American begins publication.
 1894 - Lyric Opera House opens.
 1895 - Clifton Park opens (approximate date).
 1896
 Electric Park opens.
 Colored Young Women's Christian Association founded.
 1898 - Sharp Street Memorial United Methodist Church and Community House built.

20th century
 1900
 Population: 508,957 people.
 City courthouse dedicated.
 Baltimore Morning Herald newspaper begins publication.
 1903 - Belvedere Hotel opens.
 1904 - Great Baltimore Fire.
 1908 - Washington, Baltimore and Annapolis Electric Railway begins operating.
 1911 - Pennsylvania Station (Baltimore) built.
 1912
 Arch Social Club founded.
 1912 Democratic National Convention
 1914
 Baltimore Museum of Art founded.
 Hippodrome Theatre built.
 1916
 Baltimore Symphony Orchestra formed.
 Baltimore Black Sox baseball team formed.
 1917
 Fort Holabird established.
 Lithuanian Hall opens.
 1918
  William Frederick Broening was elected mayor.
 1922
 Memorial Stadium built.
 Royal Theatre opens.
 1923 - Howard W. Jackson becomes mayor.
 1925 - University of Baltimore founded.
 1930
 Baltimore Colored Symphony Orchestra organized.
 U.S. Post Office and Courthouse built.
 1934 - Walters Art Museum established.
 1949 - Edgar Allan Poe House opens.
 1950
 Baltimore Civic Opera Company established.
 Population: 950,000 people (approximate).
 1953 - B&O Railroad Museum opens.
 1954
 Orioles baseball team relocates to Baltimore.
 Cylburn Wildflower Preserve and Garden Center formed.
 1955 - Civil rights protest at Read's Drug Store.
 1956 - Desegregation of the Baltimore City Public School System
 1962 - CFG Bank Arena opens.
 1963 - Center Stage (theater) opens.
 1964 - Baltimore News-American newspaper begins publication.
 1968
 Baltimore riot of 1968
 Baltimore American Indian Center is established.
 1971 - William Donald Schaefer becomes mayor.
 1974 - Baltimore municipal strike of 1974
 1976 - Maryland Science Center opens.
 1977 - Baltimore World Trade Center opens.
 1979
 Baltimore Convention Center opens.
 Baltimore School for the Arts founded.
 1980
 Harborplace opens.
 Baltimore Area Convention & Visitors Association formed.
 Population: 787,000 people (approximate).
 1981
 National Aquarium in Baltimore opens.
 Baltimore Museum of Industry opens.
 1982 - Joseph Meyerhoff Symphony Hall opens.
 1983
 Baltimore Metro Subway begins operating.
 Great Blacks in Wax Museum established.
 1986 - National Association for the Advancement of Colored People headquarters relocates to Baltimore.
 1987 - Kurt Schmoke becomes mayor.
 1989 - Contemporary Museum Baltimore founded.
 1992
 Baltimore Light Rail begins operating.
 Oriole Park at Camden Yards opens.
 1996 - Baltimore Ravens football team established.
 1998 - Ravens Stadium opens.
 1999 - Martin O'Malley becomes mayor.

21st century

 2000 - National Katyń Memorial is constructed.
 2002 - The Portal (community center) opens.
 2005 - Reginald F. Lewis Museum of Maryland African American History & Culture opens.
 2006 - The Baltimore Examiner begins publication.
 2008 - Hilton Baltimore built.
 2009 - Sheila Dixon trial.
 2010
 Stephanie Rawlings-Blake becomes mayor.
 Population: 620,961 people.
 2011
 Occupy Baltimore begins.
 Lyric Opera Baltimore established.
 2015 - Freddie Gray protests
 2016 - Catherine Pugh becomes mayor.
 2019 - Jack Young become mayor.
 2020 - Brandon Scott becomes mayor.

See also
 History of Baltimore
 List of mayors of Baltimore
 National Register of Historic Places listings in Baltimore, Maryland
 List of museums in Baltimore

References

Bibliography
Published in the 19th c.
 
 
 
 

Published in the 20th c.

External links

 New York Public Library. Images related to Baltimore, various dates.

 
Baltimore